Alexandra "Alex" Poznikoff (born May 16, 1997) is a Canadian ice hockey player, currently affiliated with the Professional Women's Hockey Players Association (PWHPA).

Playing career   
Poznikoff played on boy's youth hockey teams until her mid-teens. She was named MVP of the 2014 Esso Cup, after scoring 10 points in 7 games and winning a silver medal.

She would go on to play for the Alberta Pandas of the University of Alberta, where she would score 125 points in 125 games. She was named USports Player of the Year in 2019, the first Alberta Pandas player to win the award in a decade. She suffered a broken leg halfway through her final season, as she was leading the conference in scoring. She was able to return in time for the national playoffs, before they were cancelled by the COVID-19 pandemic.

After graduating, she joined the PWHPA for the 2020–21 season.

International   
Poznikoff represented Canada at the 2017 Winter Universiade, scoring three points in five games as the country won a silver medal.

Career statistics

References

External links
 

1997 births
Living people
Canadian women's ice hockey forwards
Ice hockey people from Edmonton
Professional Women's Hockey Players Association players
Universiade medalists in ice hockey
Universiade silver medalists for Canada
Competitors at the 2017 Winter Universiade
Alberta Pandas women's ice hockey players